The 2020 Ole Miss Rebels softball team represents the University of Mississippi in the 2020 NCAA Division I softball season. The Rebels play their home games at the Ole Miss Softball Complex.

Previous season

The Rebels finished the 2019 season 41–20 overall, and 13–10 in the SEC to finish fifth in the conference. The Rebels hosted a regional during the  2019 NCAA Division I softball tournament and later advanced to the Tucson Super Regional against Arizona. The Rebels were defeated by the Wildcats 0 games to 2 as Arizona advanced to the WCWS.

Preseason

SEC preseason poll
The SEC preseason poll was released on January 15, 2020.

Roster

Schedule and results

Source:
*Rankings are based on the team's current ranking in the NFCA poll.

Rankings

References

Ole Miss
Ole Miss Rebels softball seasons
Ole Miss Rebels softball